Lejla is an 1868 Czech-language opera by Karel Bendl.

Recordings
"Ó ještě čekat...V líbezném klínu" (from Lejla) Ivan Kusnjer (baritone)

References

1868 operas
Czech-language operas
Operas